Periploca palaearcticella is a moth in the family Cosmopterigidae. It was described by Sinev in 1986. It is found in Russia.

References

Natural History Museum Lepidoptera generic names catalog

Moths described in 1986
Chrysopeleiinae
Moths of Asia